Oswaldo Muñoz Mariño (Riobamba, December 24, 1923 – February 20, 2016) was an Ecuadorian architect and painter.

Biography

At fourteen years old, Muñoz Mariño lost his father, and moved with his family to Quito where they faced a tough economic situation. In that city he attended to the Instituto Nacional Mejía. In the 1930s, after the resignation of President Isidro Ayora in 1931, Ecuador went through seventeen governments in a decade. Artists and intellectuals belonged to two camps: one with Marxist socialist tendencies, and a conservative group.

At the Mejia School, one of the most notable learning institutions in Quito, Professor José Enrique Guerrero had great influence on Muñoz Mariño with his style. Muñoz Mariño's passion was also architecture. He painted buildings, evaluating their proportions, which helped in his becoming one of the most talented  architects of Ecuador in recent decades.

He co-wrote a study titled Ecuador en gráficos (Ecuador in graphs), which he traveled to Guayaquil to present with the help of Benjamín Carrión. He was fascinated with the city, and having just graduated from high school, he got a job at Tucker Mc Klure, which was in charge of building the roads between Guayaquil-Salinas, and between Quito-Esmeraldas. This experience eventually defined his vocation as an architect. He yearned to move to Mexico to study architecture, and with the support of Benjamin Carrion and the Minister of War, he was able to do it.

In 1974 he worked on the project Huayra Huanca (El origen del tiempo), which was commissioned by the Mexican government in accordance with a proposal by Oswaldo Guayasamín. In 1962 he participated in a contest for the New City Hall building of Quito, for which he was awarded a prize. Unfortunately his design was never built. In 1962 and 1964 he exhibited his work in Mexico City and in its College of Architects.  But in 1965 he won the first prize in the Annual Watercolor Exhibition in the College of Architects of Mexico, which opened the door to fame.

He has traveled almost 100 cities around the world, of which he has painted 74.

In 1999 he was awarded Ecuador's highest national art prize Premio Eugenio Espejo by the President of Ecuador.

References 

1923 births
2016 deaths
People from Riobamba
Ecuadorian painters